The South Island line (West) is a proposed extension of the Hong Kong MTR metro system. The new line would serve the southwestern coast of Hong Kong Island, between Shek Tong Tsui and Wong Chuk Hang. Plans for the South Island line (West) are mentioned and revised in the government's Railway Development Strategy 2014 (RDS-2014) report. and construction was planned to begin in 2021–2026 in the report. 

Like the existing South Island line, this line would connect the Southern District to the rest of the MTR network.

History

Stations
The following is a list of the stations on the South Island line (West).

Notes

See also 
 Future projects of the MTR

References

Further reading
Papers from Government and Legislature
 .
 .
 .
 .

Press releases
. (30 June 2005). From MTR Corporation.
https://web.archive.org/web/20140318191939/http://www.mtr-southislandline.hk/pdf/press-release/26022014_pr_e.pdf

External links

 MTR West Island line and South Island line introduction
 Papers from Legislative Council concerning West Island line and South Island line

 
1432 mm gauge railways in Hong Kong
MTR lines
Central and Western District, Hong Kong
Southern District, Hong Kong
Proposed railway lines in Hong Kong